Lubikowo  is a village in the administrative district of Gmina Przytoczna, within Międzyrzecz County, Lubusz Voivodeship, in western Poland. As of 2008, the population was 835.

References

Lubikowo